The men's 1 metre springboard diving competition at the 2018 Central American and Caribbean Games in Barranquilla was held on 19 and 20 July at the Complejo Acuático.

Format 
The competition was held in two rounds:
 Preliminary round: All 13 divers perform six dives; the top 8 divers advance to the final.
 Final: The 8 divers perform six dives and the top three divers win the gold, silver and bronze medals accordingly.

Schedule 
All times are Colombia Time (UTC−5)

Results 
Source:
Green denotes finalists.

References

Diving at the 2018 Central American and Caribbean Games
2018